Aristocles of Messene, in Sicily, was a Peripatetic philosopher, who probably lived in the 1st century AD. He may have been the teacher of Alexander of Aphrodisias.

According to the Suda and Eudokia, he wrote several works:
Πότερον σπουδαιότερος Ὅμηρος ἢ Πλάτων – Whether Homer or Plato is more Worthy.
Τέχναι ῥητορικαί – Arts of Rhetoric.
A work on the god Serapis.
A work on Ethics, in nine books.
A work on Philosophy, in ten books.

The last of these works appears to have been a history of philosophy in which he wrote about the philosophers, their schools, and doctrines. Several fragments of it are preserved in Eusebius' work Praeparatio Evangelica.

Notes

References 
 Maria Lorenza Chiesara (ed.), Aristocles of Messene. Testimonia and Fragments, New York, Oxford University Press, 2001.

1st-century philosophers
1st-century Greek people
Roman-era Peripatetic philosophers
Philosophers of Roman Italy
Philosophers of Magna Graecia